Vandort is a surname. Notable people with the surname include:

Michael Vandort (born 1980), Sri Lankan cricketer
Rebeca Vandort (born 1994), Sri Lankan cricketer

See also
Van Dort